Sébastien Rosseler (born 15 July 1981) is a Belgian professional road racing cyclist who rides for Veranclassic-Doltcini. Between 2012 and 2013, Rosseler competed with UCI ProTeam . Born in Verviers, Wallonia, Belgium, Rosseler currently resides in Tongeren, Flanders, Belgium.

Career achievements

Major results

2002
 1st  Overall Le Triptyque des Monts et Châteaux
2003
 1st  Overall Le Triptyque des Monts et Châteaux
 Olympia's Tour
1st  Points classification
1st Stages 1, 6 & 7 (ITT)
 6th De Vlaamse Pijl
2004
 8th Overall Four Days of Dunkirk
 9th Gent–Wevelgem
2006
 2nd Overall Tour of Belgium
 3rd Halle–Ingooigem
 4th Overall Three Days of De Panne
 7th Overall Four Days of Dunkirk
1st  Young rider classification
2007
 1st Stage 1 (TTT) Tour of Qatar
 4th Overall Tour of Belgium
 4th Time trial, National Road Championships
 6th Overall Three Days of De Panne
 8th Overall Eneco Tour
1st Stage 5 (ITT)
2008
 2nd Overall Circuit Franco–Belge
1st Stage 4
 2nd Overall Eneco Tour
 5th Paris–Brussels
 8th Kampioenschap van Vlaanderen
2009
 1st Stage 4 Four Days of Dunkirk
 1st Stage 5 (ITT) Tour of Belgium
 2nd Time trial, National Road Championships
2010
 1st Brabantse Pijl
 1st Stage 4 Volta ao Algarve
 2nd Time trial, National Road Championships
2011
 1st  Overall Three Days of De Panne
1st Stage 3 (ITT)
 2nd Overall Driedaagse van West-Vlaanderen
2012
 1st Stage 4 (TTT) Giro d'Italia

Grand Tour general classification results timeline

References

External links

Cycling Base: Sébastien Rosseler
Cycling Quotient: Sébastien Rosseler
Veranclassic-Doltcini: Sébastien Rosseler

1981 births
Living people
People from Verviers
Belgian male cyclists
Cyclists from Liège Province